China National Highway 327 (G327) runs southeast from Guyuan, Ningxia via Heze, Shandong towards Lianyungang, Jiangsu. It is 2,024 kilometres in length. It was extended to Guyuan in the 2013 National Highway Network Plan.

Route and distance

See also 

 China National Highways

Transport in Jiangsu
Transport in Shandong
327